Nikiforovo is a rural locality (a village) in Pershinskoye Rural Settlement, Kirzhachsky District, Vladimir Oblast, Russia. The population was 27 as of 2010. There are 5 streets.

Geography 
Nikiforovo is located 20 km south of Kirzhach (the district's administrative centre) by road. Ilyinskoye is the nearest rural locality.

References 

Rural localities in Kirzhachsky District